Remzşinas Hanım (meaning "Knower of Signs"), also called Remsşinaz Hanım was a consort of Sultan Murad V of the Ottoman Empire.

Life
Murad ascended the throne on 30 May 1876, after the deposition of his uncle Sultan Abdulaziz, After reigning for three months, Murad was deposed on 30 August 1876, due to mental instability and was imprisoned in the Çırağan Palace. Remzşinas was Circassian, and came to Istanbul after the Russian invasion of Caucasus. She was chosen to be sent to Çırağan Palace around 1881, where Murad took her as his consort. 

She was widowed at Murad's death in 1904, after which her ordeal in the Çırağan Palace came to an end. In widowhood, her stipend consisted of 1500 kuruş. However, later, during the reign of Sultan Mehmed V, it was reduced to only 500 kuruş. After which her step-daughter, Hatice Sultan, wrote to Mehmet Cavit Bey, member of the Committee of Union and Progress (CUP), asking him to raise her stipend at least to 800 kuruş. After Murad's death she initially stayed at Çırağan Palace to keep company with Şayan Kadın, the third consort, who refused to leave Palace, but in 1910 she was sent to Bursa with other consorts Nevdürr Hanım, Gevherriz Hanım and Filizten Hanım. She returned to Istanbul in 1914.

At the exile of the imperial family in March 1924, Remzşinas as being the adjunct member of the family decided to stay in Istanbul. She died on after 1934.

In literature
 Remzşinas is a character in Ayşe Osmanoğlu's historical novel The Gilded Cage on the Bosphorus (2020).

See also
Ikbal (title)
Ottoman Imperial Harem
List of consorts of the Ottoman sultans

References

Sources

1864 births
Year of death unknown
19th-century consorts of Ottoman sultans